Nikola Vasiljević (Serbian Cyrillic: Никола Васиљевић; born 19 December 1983) is a Bosnian-Herzegovinian retired  footballer who has played as a defender for FK Drina Zvornik.

Playing career

Club
Born in Zvornik, Vasiljević has played club football with Bosnian-Herzegovinian side FK Modriča, appearing in the UEFA Cup. He had a brief spell in the Prva HNL with NK Croatia Sesvete in 2010.

In 2011, Vasiljević joined Kazakh side FC Shakhter Karagandy and appeared in all but one league match in the 2011 season.

On 1 June 2017, Vasiljević left Shakhter Karagandy by mutual consent.

It was announced on 24 January 2019, that Vasiljević had returned to FK Drina Zvornik.

International
Vasiljević made two appearances for the full Bosnia and Herzegovina national football team, in two friendlies in 2006.

Personal
Vasiljević has been confused with another footballer who shares his name and birthdate, but was born in Serbia.

Career statistics

Club

International

Statistics accurate as of 6 November 2015

Honours
FK Modriča
Premier League of Bosnia and Herzegovina (1): 2007–08
Shakhter Karagandy
Kazakhstan Premier League (2): 2011, 2012
Kazakhstan Cup (1): 2013
Kazakhstan Super Cup (1): 2013

References

External links
 
 
 

1983 births
Living people
People from Zvornik
Serbs of Bosnia and Herzegovina
Association football central defenders
Bosnia and Herzegovina footballers
Bosnia and Herzegovina international footballers
FK Drina Zvornik players
FK Modriča players
Jeju United FC players
NK Croatia Sesvete players
NK Zvijezda Gradačac players
FC Shakhter Karagandy players
FK Sloboda Tuzla players
FK Zvijezda 09 players
First League of the Republika Srpska players
Premier League of Bosnia and Herzegovina players
K League 1 players
Croatian Football League players
Kazakhstan Premier League players
Bosnia and Herzegovina expatriate footballers
Expatriate footballers in South Korea
Bosnia and Herzegovina expatriate sportspeople in South Korea
Expatriate footballers in Croatia
Bosnia and Herzegovina expatriate sportspeople in Croatia
Expatriate footballers in Kazakhstan
Bosnia and Herzegovina expatriate sportspeople in Kazakhstan